Nastaneer is a Bengali-language drama film directed by Pashupati Chatterjee. This movie was released in 1951 under the banner of M. P. Productions Pvt. Ltd. The music direction was done by Rabin Chattopadhyay. This film stars Uttam Kumar, Sunanda Banerjee, Dhiraj Das who played in lead roles where Karabi Gupta and Kamal Mitra played the supporting roles. This is the fifth film of Uttam Kumar. The film is based on the novella Nastanirh of Rabindranath Tagore wrote in 1901. Later Satyajit Ray made a film based on this same novel Charulata in 1964.

Plot
Nastanirh takes place in late 19th-century Bengal and explores the lives of the "Bhadralok", Bengalis of wealth who were part of the Bengal Renaissance and highly influenced by the Brahmo Samaj. Despite his liberal ideas, Bhupati is blind to the loneliness and dissatisfaction of his wife, Charu. It is only with the appearance of his cousin, Amal, who incites passionate feelings in Charu, that Bhupati realizes what he has lost.

Cast
 Uttam Kumar as Amal
 Sunanda Banerjee as Charu
 Dhiraj Das as Bhupati
 Goutam Mukhopadhyay
 Kamal Mitra
 Karabi Gupta
 Nibhanani Devi
 Rajlakshmi Devi
 Santosh Singha
 Sikharani Bag

Soundtrack

References

External links
 

1951 films
Bengali-language Indian films
1951 drama films
1950s Bengali-language films
Indian drama films